Garry James Cardiff (born August 29, 1944 died October 25, 1987) is a Canadian retired professional ice hockey defenceman who played 200 games in the World Hockey Association for the Philadelphia Blazers and Vancouver Blazers.

References

External links

1944 births
Living people
Canadian ice hockey defencemen
Sportspeople from Dauphin, Manitoba
Johnstown Red Wings players
North American Hockey League (1973–1977) coaches
Philadelphia Blazers players
Vancouver Blazers players
Ice hockey people from Manitoba